The Atlas Underground Fire is the second collaborative album by American rock musician Tom Morello. The album was released on October 15, 2021, and features guest appearances from Bring Me the Horizon, Bruce Springsteen and Eddie Vedder, Grandson, Phantogram, Damian Marley, Mike Posner, Chris Stapleton, Phem, Protohype, Dennis Lyxzén of Refused and Sama' Abdulhadi.

Critical reception 

Wall of Sound rated the album 7/10, stating that "not every songs sticks" and that Morello was "playing in a lot of different sandpits ... but there's a lot to like here".

Track listing

References

2021 albums
Tom Morello albums
Mom + Pop Music albums